Megaloctena is a genus of moths of the family Noctuidae. The genus was described by Warren in 1913. All the species are found in western China.

Species
Megaloctena alpherakyi (Leech, 1900)
Megaloctena angulata (Leech, 1900)
Megaloctena mandarina (Leech, 1900)
Megaloctena punctilinea (Leech, 1900) also found in Japan
Megaloctena sordida (Leech, 1900)

References

Herminiinae